John Baptist Ashe (1748November 27, 1802) was a slave owner, U.S. Congressman, and Continental Army officer from Halifax, North Carolina.

Biography
He was born in the Rocky Point District of the Province of North Carolina in 1748. He was the son of Samuel Ashe and Mary Porter Ashe (cousin to her husband and first wife).  His father's residence was called the Neck and was on the northeast Cape Fear River.  His father was to be governor of the state and also brother of North Carolina militia General John Ashe. He dropped the "a" from his middle name and was known as John Baptist Ashe.

He owned at least 63 slaves as of the 1790 census.

Military service
He served as a lieutenant in the Province of North Carolina New Hanover County militia during the time of the Regulator uprising in 1771.  Later, during the American Revolutionary War, he served as a minuteman in the Salisbury District, and the 6th North Carolina Regiment of the North Carolina Line (Continental Army), leading the "Majors" company. He fought at the Battle of Moore's Creek Bridge on February 27, 1776, after which the minutemen battalions were disbanded in favor of local militia and the Continental Army.  He joined the 6th North Carolina Regiment as a captain and later promoted to major and then lieutenant colonel. He was at Valley Forge and fought at the Battle of Brandywine Creek in Pennsylvania on September 11, 1777; Battle of Germantown in Pennsylvania on October 4, 1777; and Battle of Monmouth in New Jersey on June 28, 1778.

Political career
He served in the Province of North Carolina House of Burgesses in 1775.  Ashe was elected to the North Carolina House of Commons (17841786) and served as Speaker of that body in 1786. He was a delegate to the Congress of the Confederation in 1787. In 1789, Ashe was a delegate and Chairman of the Committee of the whole of the Fayetteville Convention that ratified the Constitution of the United States. That same year, he served in the North Carolina Senate.

Ashe was elected to the 1st United States Congress and the 2nd United States Congress as an "Anti-Administration" (what became Anti-Federalist or Democratic-Republican) candidate, serving from 1790 to 1793.

In 1802, the North Carolina General Assembly elected Ashe Governor, but he died before he could take office. He is buried in Halifax.

Family
On October 7, 1779, he married Elizabeth Montfort.  They lived on the outskirts of Halifax, North Carolina.  They had one child, Samuel Porter Ashe, born on July 17, 1791.

His namesake and nephew, John Baptista Ashe, served in Congress as a Representative from Tennessee.

References

External links
 Ashe's Congressional biography
 

|-

|-

1748 births
1802 deaths
18th-century American politicians
American planters
American slave owners
Anti-Federalists
Ashe family
Burials in North Carolina
Elected officials who died without taking their seats
Continental Army officers from North Carolina
Continental Congressmen from North Carolina
Members of the North Carolina House of Burgesses
Members of the North Carolina House of Representatives
Members of the North Carolina Provincial Congresses
Members of the United States House of Representatives from North Carolina
People from Pender County, North Carolina
People of colonial North Carolina